Jimmy Cross (November 17, 1938 – October 8, 1978), also known as Jimmie Cross, was an American radio producer and singer who attained a minor Billboard Hot 100 hit with the novelty song "I Want My Baby Back" in 1965.

Life and career
He was born in Dothan, Alabama, and became the producer of the syndicated radio series Country Concert.

"I Want My Baby Back"
"I Want My Baby Back" was originally issued on the Tollie Records label and reached #92 on the Billboard Hot 100 in February 1965. The song is a parody of teenage tragedy songs of that period, and has since become a cult classic as a result of frequent airplay on the Dr. Demento show. 

The singer narrates a traffic crash initially similar to the one described in J. Frank Wilson's 1961 hit "Last Kiss", but is revealed to be another angle of the fatal crash at the climax of The Shangri-Las' 1964 hit "Leader of the Pack". The singer is the sole survivor, the motorcycle gang and its leader are dead, and his girlfriend is fatally dismembered by the impact ("Over there was my baby . . . and over there was my baby . . . and way over there was my baby").   After months of unabated grief, the distraught singer, in an apparent fit of insanity, decides that he is going to have his girl back "one way or another." With realistic sound effects, he unearths her grave ("Oh, baby, I dig you so much!"), crawls into her coffin, and closes the lid for a muffled final chorus of "I Got My Baby Back." 

In 1977 British BBC radio DJ Kenny Everett named "I Want My Baby Back" #1 in the "Bottom 30" after a public vote, and it won the title of "The World's Worst Record". The following year it was released for the first time in the UK on Everett's compilation album The World's Worst Record Show, which was released in June 1978. It also was included on The Rhino Brothers Present the World's Worst Records, a 1983 collection of tasteless or poorly performed songs.

Other recordings
Cross went on to record (as Jimmie Cross) "The Ballad of James Bong" (Tollie), "Hey Little Girl" (Red Bird) and "Super-Duper Man" (Red Bird).

Death
He died of a heart attack at the age of 39 in Hollywood.  He is buried at Forest Lawn, California.

References

External links
 brief bio of the song

1938 births
1978 deaths
People from Dothan, Alabama
Songwriters from Alabama
20th-century American singers